The Arado Ar 64 was a single-seat biplane fighter, developed in the late 1920s. It was among the first fighters produced when Germany abandoned the restrictions of the Treaty of Versailles and began rearming.

Design and development
The Ar 64 was a derivative of the earlier Arado SD II and Arado SD III, based upon the Reichswehrministeriums (Reich War Ministry) requirement for a successor to the Fokker D.XIII fighter. The AR 64D and 64E would be the first fighters built in quantity by Germany since the end of World War I. The two differed, as the 64D had a revised undercarriage and a four-blade propeller, and the 64E had a two-blade propeller attached to a direct-drive version of the Jupiter VI radial engine. In the summer of 1932, 20 aircraft of both types were ordered and 19 of them were assigned to the Jagdfliegerschule at Schleissheim and the Jagdstaffeln of the Fliegergruppe Doberitz and Fliegergruppe Damm.

Variants
Data from: 
Ar 64a Prototype, powered by a 395 kW (530 hp) Bristol Jupiter VI nine-cylinder radial. First flight in 1930. One built
Ar 64b Only two built, powered by a 477 kW (640 hp) BMW VI 6.3 12-cylinder V-type water-cooled engine. First flight in 1931. Two built.
Ar 64c Powered by a 395 kW (530 hp) Jupiter VI radial, but with minor structural changes. One built.
Ar 64D Production model. Featured redesigned, and enlarged vertical tail surfaces and a revised undercarriage. Powered by a geared Jupiter VI radial. A total of 20 D and E model Ar 64s were built.
Ar 64E Production model. Similar to the 64d but with a direct-drive version of the Jupiter VI radial. A total of 20 D and E model Ar 64s were built.

Operators

Reichswehr

Luftwaffe

Specifications (Ar 64D)

See also

Notes

References

Green, William, and Gordon Swanborough, The Complete Book of Fighters  (Salamander Books, 2002)

Arado Ar 064
Ar 064
Single-engined tractor aircraft
Biplanes
Aircraft first flown in 1930